This page covers all the important events in the sport of tennis in 1995. Primarily, it provides the results of notable tournaments throughout the year on both the ATP and WTA Tours, the Davis Cup, and the Fed Cup.

ITF

Grand Slam events
Australian Open (link)
MS: Andre Agassi d. Pete Sampras, 4-6, 6-1, 7-6, 6-4.
WS: Mary Pierce d. Arantxa Sánchez Vicario, 6-3, 6-2
MD: Jared Palmer & Richey Reneberg d. Mark Knowles & Daniel Nestor, 6-3, 3-6, 6-3, 6-2.
WD: Jana Novotná & Arantxa Sánchez Vicario d. Gigi Fernández & Natalia Zvereva, 6-3, 6-7(7-3), 6-4.
MX: Natalia Zvereva & Rick Leach d. Gigi Fernández & Cyril Suk, 7-6(7-4), 6-7(3-7), 6-4.
French Open (link)
MS: Thomas Muster d. Michael Chang, 7-5, 6-2, 6-4.
WS: Steffi Graf d. Arantxa Sánchez Vicario, 7-5, 4-6, 6-0.
MD: Jacco Eltingh & Paul Haarhuis d. Nicklas Kulti & Magnus Larsson, 6-7, 6-4, 6-1.
WD: Gigi Fernández & Natasha Zvereva d. Jana Novotná & Arantxa Sánchez Vicario, 6-7(6-8), 6-4, 7-5.
MX: Larisa Neiland & Todd Woodbridge d. Jill Hetherington & John-Laffnie de Jager, 7-6(8-6), 7-6(7-4).
Wimbledon (link)
MS: Pete Sampras d. Boris Becker, 6-7, 6-2, 6-4, 6-2. 
WS: Steffi Graf d. Arantxa Sánchez Vicario, 4-6, 6-1, 7-5. 
MD: Todd Woodbridge & Mark Woodforde d. Rik Leach & D.S. Melville, 7-5, 7-6(10-8), 7-6(7-5).
WD: Jana Novotná & Arantxa Sánchez Vicario d. Gigi Fernández & Natasha Zvereva, 5-7, 7-5, 6-4.
MX: Martina Navratilova & Jonathan Stark d. Gigi Fernández & Cyril Suk, 6-4, 6-4.
US Open (link)
MS: Pete Sampras d. Andre Agassi, 6-4, 6-3, 4-6, 7-5. 
WS: Steffi Graf d. Monica Seleš, 7-6, 0-6, 6-3. 
MD: Todd Woodbridge & Mark Woodforde
WD: Gigi Fernández & Natalia Zvereva
MX: Meredith McGrath & Matt Lucena

Davis Cup
(Moscow, Russia)
Final: USA d. Russia, 3-2.
Team USA: Jim Courier, Todd Martin & Pete Sampras
Team Russia: Andrei Chesnokov, Yevgeny Kafelnikov & Andrei Olhovskiy

Fed Cup
(Valencia, Spain)
Final: Spain d. USA, 3-2.
Team Spain: Conchita Martínez, María Sánchez Lorenzo & Arantxa Sánchez Vicario
Team USA: Lindsay Davenport, Gigi Fernández, Mary Joe Fernández & Chanda Rubin

Hopman Cup
Final: Germany 
Team Germany: Anke Huber & Boris Becker

ATP Super 9
Indian Wells: Pete Sampras d. Andre Agassi, 7-5, 6-3, 7-5
Miami: Andre Agassi d. Pete Sampras, 3-6, 6-2, 7-6
Monte Carlo: Thomas Muster d. Boris Becker, 4-6, 5-7, 6-1, 7-6(6), 6-0
Hamburg: Andrei Medvedev d. Goran Ivanišević, 6-3, 6-2, 6-1
Rome: Thomas Muster d. Sergi Bruguera, 3-6, 7-6(5), 6-2, 6-3
Canada: Andre Agassi d. Pete Sampras, 3-6, 6-2, 6-3
Cincinnati: Andre Agassi d. Michael Chang, 7-5, 6-2
Madrid: Thomas Muster d. MaliVai Washington, 7-6(6), 2-6, 6-3, 6-4
Paris: Pete Sampras d. Boris Becker, 7-6(5), 6-4, 6-4

ATP Tour World Championships
Singles: Boris Becker d. Michael Chang, 7-6, 6-0, 7-6.
Doubles: Grant Connell & Patrick Galbraith

WTA
1995 WTA calendar

WTA Tour Championships
Singles: Steffi Graf d. Anke Huber, 6-1, 2-6, 6-1, 4-6, 6-3. 
Doubles: Jana Novotná & Arantxa Sánchez Vicario

International Tennis Hall of Fame
Class of 1995:
Chris Evert, player

 
Tennis by year